Bactra lancealana is a moth of the family Tortricidae found in Europe. The moth has a wingspan of 11–20 mm.
The forewings are pale ochreous or ochreous- brownish, costa strigulated with darker ochreous or dark fuscous; a spot in disc at 1/3 and an angular mark beyond middle dark fuscous, often obsolete, sometimes forming a more or less complete dark median streak from base to apex; central fascia sometimes indicated on costa. Hindwings are grey. The larva is greenish or whitish-fleshcolour; head and plate of 2 black. It is very similar to Bactra furfurana.

The moth flies from May to October. 

Bactra lancealana larvae mainly feed on various rushes, including Juncus and Scirpus.

References

Notes
The flight season refers to Belgium and the Netherlands. This may vary in other parts of the range.

External links
 waarneming.nl 
 Lepidoptera of Belgium
 Taxonomy
 Bactra lancealana at UKmoths

Bactrini
Moths described in 1799
Tortricidae of Europe